Kokuyo Camlin Ltd., formerly known as "Camlin Ltd.", is an Indian Multinational stationery manufacturing company based in Mumbai.

The company commercialises a wide range of products related to art materials, writing implements and office goods.

History 
Camlin was established in 1931 by D. P. Dandekar and his brother G. P. Dandekar, starting operations as "Dandekar & Co." with "Horse Brand" Ink powders and tablets in 1931, and shortly started producing "Camel ink" for fountain pens. It was incorporated as a private company in 1946, and then turned into a public limited company in 1998.

In May 2012, Japanese stationery major, "Kokuyo Co. Ltd", acquired a 50.74% stake in Camlin, the leading Indian manufacturer by then. Kokuyo paid 366 crore for the acquisition. Dilip Dandekar continued as chairman and managing director of the company. The deal intended to facilitate the entry of Kokuyo products, mainly paper and office stationery into the Indian market. On the other hand, Camlin aimed to increase its exports to other countries.

At the moment of the deal, Camlin had more than 2,000 products, mainly pencils, pastels, inks and markers. Also, Kokuyo retained the Camlin and Camel brands. That stake then would go up to 74.99% including a very small less than 1 percent stake of Dandekar family.

Products
Kokuyo Camlin's range of products include:

See also 
 Hindustan Pencils
 Kokuyo

References

External links
 

Pen manufacturers
Manufacturing companies based in Mumbai
Manufacturing companies established in 1931
Multinational joint-venture companies
Indian brands
Indian companies established in 1931
Companies listed on the Bombay Stock Exchange
Indian companies established in 1946